The MetaArchive Cooperative is an international digital preservation network composed of libraries, archives, and other memory institutions. As of August 2011, the MetaArchive preservation network is composed of 24 secure servers (referred to as “caches”) in four countries with a collective capacity of over 300TB. Forty-eight institutions are actively preserving their digital collections in the network.  

The MetaArchive Cooperative preserves a wide variety of data types and many genres of content, including electronic theses and dissertations, digital newspapers, archival content such as photograph collections and A/V materials, business/e-records, and datasets. The network is “dark,” meaning access is limited to the content owner/contributor. It is also format-agnostic, meaning that each content contributor may determine what formats it wishes to preserve.

History
MetaArchive was founded in 2004, when six southeastern University libraries (Auburn University, Florida State University, Emory University, the Georgia Tech Library, University of Louisville, and Virginia Tech) came together to collaboratively explore creating a digital preservation solution that they could own and manage for themselves. With backing from the National Digital Information Infrastructure and Preservation Program (NDIIPP), they used the LOCKSS software  to build one of the world’s first operational digital preservation networks. In 2006, these six institutions created an organizational model to enable the project to transition into a sustainable program hosted not by any single member institution, but rather by the Educopia Institute, a 501(c)3 organization that was launched for this purpose. In 2007, the MetaArchive Cooperative began expanding with the addition of new members.

How it works
MetaArchive enables memory institutions (libraries, archives, museums, historical societies, etc.) to embed both the technical infrastructure and the knowledge that they need to preserve their digital content within their own institutions. 

Each member institution hosts a server, or “cache”, within the network. All of these caches are united into a closed network using the LOCKSS software. Content is prepared by members as “submission information packages” (SIPs), (see OAIS for more information) and each of these SIPs is replicated seven times and ingested and preserved as AIPs (“archival information packages”) in seven geographically separate caches by member institutions. The network regularly compares these seven AIPs to ensure that nothing about them degrades or changes. If the network detects a change in an AIP, the cache containing the damaged copy re-ingests the source SIP if it is still available; if the source SIP is unavailable, it ingests a copy of the AIP from another cache.

Services
MetaArchive’s services include data preparation, replication, geographical distribution, bit integrity checking, versioning, security, restricted viewing, and content restoration. When needed, the MetaArchive Cooperative will also perform format migrations for member content (to date, this service has not been required by the Cooperative’s membership). The Cooperative’s ingest procedure is compatible with any repository/content management system, including DSpace, CONTENTdm, ETDdb, and other systems.

Membership Levels
The Cooperative has three membership levels:
 Sustaining Members form the leadership of the Cooperative via their participation as Steering Committee members.
 Preservation Members engage in ongoing preservation activities.
 Collaborative Members are groups of institutions that run shared, centralized repositories and preserve this shared content in the MetaArchive preservation network.

All members run a 16TB server and pay $1/GB/year for their preserved collections. 

The organizational model created and practiced by the MetaArchive Cooperative has served as a model for myriad other digital preservation groups, including the National Digital Stewardship Alliance (NDSA).

References

American digital libraries